José María Marco Tobarra (born 1955) is a Spanish essayist and liberal-conservative opinion journalist.

Biography 
He was born in 1955 in Madrid. In 1972 after studying Philosophy at the University of Paris VIII, he obtained a licentiate degree in Hispanic Philology at the Complutense University of Madrid and a PhD in Literature in the later university. He is openly gay. Described as a "reneged far-left militant turned into one of the minds behind the (promotion of) 'American way' conservatism" in Spain, he advocates for "giving moral and civic content to the liberal doctrinary corpus".

A contributor to media outlets such as La Razón, La Ilustración Liberal and Libertad Digital (of which he is a founding member), Marco has also collaborated in conservative think tanks such as FAES, FIL and the "Floridablanca Network". He has also worked as associate lecturer of International Relations at the Comillas Pontifical University.

He contested the April 2019 Senate election in Madrid as candidate of the far-right Vox, commanding  votes, short of the  votes obtained by the last elected senator. He also ran second in the party list for the 26 May 2019 Madrilenian regional election, and, thus, he was elected member of the regional legislature, as Vox obtained 12 out of the 132 seats up for election. However, Marco refused to assume the parliamentary seat before the inaugural session of the new legislative term citing "health motives".

Works 
Author
 
 
 
 
 
 
 
 
 
Coordinator

References 

Living people
1955 births
Complutense University of Madrid alumni
Spanish gay writers
Spanish LGBT journalists
Spanish LGBT politicians
Politicians from Madrid
Spanish opinion journalists
Spanish writers
Paris 8 University Vincennes-Saint-Denis alumni
Vox (political party) politicians
Writers from Madrid